The yellow heart-tongued frog (Phyllodytes luteolus)  is a species of frog in the family Hylidae endemic to Brazil. Its natural habitats are subtropical or tropical moist lowland forests, subtropical or tropical moist shrubland, and heavily degraded former forests.
It is threatened by habitat loss.

References

Phyllodytes
Endemic fauna of Brazil
Amphibians described in 1824
Taxonomy articles created by Polbot